Sebastián Suárez (born 19 February 1978, in Montevideo, Uruguay) is a Uruguayan footballer who played in the top divisions of Uruguay and Chile.

Teams
  Bella Vista 1996–2000
  Liverpool 2001–2003
  Central Español 2004–2007
  Fénix 2007–2008
  Cerro 2008–2009
  Cobresal 2009
  Cerro 2010
  Defensor Sporting 2010–2011
  Cerro 2011–2012
  Atenas de San Carlos 2012–2013
Source: BDFA

References

External links
 Profile at BDFA 

1978 births
Living people
Uruguayan footballers
Uruguayan expatriate footballers
Uruguayan Primera División players
Centro Atlético Fénix players
Central Español players
C.A. Cerro players
C.A. Bella Vista players
Defensor Sporting players
Liverpool F.C. (Montevideo) players
Cobresal footballers
Expatriate footballers in Chile

Association football defenders